Piledriver or pile driver may refer to:

Pile driver, a mechanical device used in construction
Piledriver (professional wrestling), a move used in professional wrestling

Entertainment
 Piledriver (album), a 1972 album by Status Quo
 Piledriver: The Wrestling Album II, a 1987 album produced by the World Wrestling Federation
 Piledriver (band), a Canadian thrash/heavy metal band
 Piledriver (comics), a Marvel Comics villain
 "Piledriver" (Space Ghost Coast to Coast), a television episode
 The Piledriver, a drop tower ride at WWE Niagara Falls

Other uses
Pile Driver, a U.S. nuclear test
Piledriver (microarchitecture), a CPU microarchitecture by AMD
Piledriver (sex position), a sexual position

Piledriver is also a standard term in football (or soccer in the US) for a super hard shot caught sweetly with all the players force.